Edward "Cousin Eddie" Garafola (March 25, 1938 - September 28, 2020) was a Gambino crime family captain who dominated the construction industry in New York City until the early 2000s. Garafola is believed to have been an American Mafia member since the mid-1970s. He was the brother-in-law of former underboss Sammy "The Bull" Gravano, married to Gravano's sister Fran.

In May 1985, Garafola was charged with tax evasion for failing to report income from a New York discothèque that he owned with Gravano and a third Staten Island resident. Garafola and Gravano were also suspects to the murder of Frank Fiala outside of the same discothèque, although they were not convicted. On March 2, 2000, Garafola was charged with racketeering in a classic "pump and dump" stock fraud and money laundering scheme that made him $41 million over a three-year period. Slapped with a 43-count indictment and several RICO charges, Garafola was prepared to do life in prison. Garafola's son Mario, a reputed Gambino soldier and key player, was also charged and convicted in the plot. Edward copped a plea agreement to do life in prison in order reduce his son's sentence. As of April 2012, Mario Garafola had been released from FCC Allenwood. Said Gravano:

It's my brother-in-law Eddie. He's caused me nothing but trouble with his devious ways, always looking for the angle. He was a schemer, he always knew how to make money. But he's got a big edge with me. His wife is my sister and I ain't ever going to hurt her.

In September 1996, Peter Gotti visited his brother, Gambino boss John Gotti, in prison. John reportedly told Peter, then acting boss, to have Thomas "Huck" Carbonara and Garafola kill Gravano. Carbonara and Garafola reportedly made several trips to Arizona, where the media had revealed Gravano was hiding, to set up a hit. Gravano's arrest on drug charges in 2000 ended this venture. On May 22, 2003, Garafola was indicted in New York for plotting to murder Gravano.

Suspected of being involved in nearly two dozen murders dating back to the 1970s, Garafola pleaded guilty to the 2004 murder of his cousin, Edward "The Chink" Garofalo, although he claimed in court documents that he was not present the night of the shooting. On September 6, 2007, Garafola was sentenced to life in prison.

In 2015, Garafola was denied compassionate release. A law enforcement source said Edward Garafola has not been "put on the shelf", or retired by the Gambinos, and he could theoretically give orders to mob associates if he came home.

Garafola died on September 28, 2020. 

He is not related to his namesake Eddie Garafola who was killed in 1990 in a hit orchestrated by Sammy Gravano.

References

Further reading
Eppolito, Lou and Bob Drury. Mob: Stories of Death and Betrayal from Organized Crime. New York: Simon & Schuster, 1992. 
Maas, Peter. Underboss: Sammy the Bull Gravano's Story of Life in the Mafia. New York: HarperCollins Publishers, 1997. 
Milito, Lynda and Reg Potterton. Mafia Wife: My Story of Love, Murder, and Madness. New York: HarperCollins Publishers, 2004.

External links
United States of America vs. JOHN MATERA, THOMAS CARBONARO, and PETER GOTTI

1939 births
Living people
American gangsters of Italian descent
Gambino crime family